Andre Pierre Stolz (born 10 May 1970) is an Australian professional golfer.

Early life and professional career
Stolz was born in Brisbane, Australia. He turned professional in 1992. He has played on the PGA Tour of Australasia, Japan Golf Tour (2001), Nationwide Tour (2003), and PGA Tour (2004–05).

In 2003, he won the LaSalle Bank Open on the Nationwide Tour and finished 13th on the money list, earning his PGA Tour card for 2004. On the PGA Tour, he won the 2004 Michelin Championship at Las Vegas with a stroke victory over Tag Ridings, securing his card through 2006. However, an injury to his left wrist in 2005 halted his career. After taking three years off, Stolz went back to playing, competing in his native Australia, Asia, and the Nationwide Tour. In 2011, he led the OneAsia Tour's Order of Merit with two wins. Stolz also played two events on the PGA Tour, his first on the tour since 2005.

Personal life
In 2013, Andre and his son Zac became the first father-son duo since 1979 (Gary and Wayne Player) to compete at the Australian Open. In 2013, Zac started playing collegiately at Chattanooga.

Professional wins (11)

PGA Tour wins (1)

Japan Golf Tour wins (1)

PGA Tour of Australasia wins (5)

PGA Tour of Australasia playoff record (2–0)

Nationwide Tour wins (1)

OneAsia Tour wins (2)

PGA of Australia Legends Tour wins (1)

Results in major championships

CUT = missed the halfway cut
Note: Stolz only played in the PGA Championship.

Results in The Players Championship

CUT = missed the halfway cut

Results in World Golf Championships

See also
2003 Nationwide Tour graduates

References

External links

Profile from 2005 PGA Championship

Australian male golfers
PGA Tour of Australasia golfers
Japan Golf Tour golfers
PGA Tour golfers
Korn Ferry Tour graduates
Golfers from Brisbane
Sportsmen from Queensland
1970 births
Living people